Michael Paul Speidel (born May 25, 1937) is a German-born American military historian and archaeologist who specializes in the study of the Roman army and ancient warfare. He is considered one of the world's foremost experts on ancient warfare.

Biography
Michael Paul Speidel was born in Pforzheim, Germany on May 25, 1937. His nephew Michael Alexander Speidel is also a historian.

Speidel received his Ph.D. in ancient history from the University of Freiburg in 1962. His Ph.D. thesis was on the Emperor's Guard. He then went to the United States to lecture ancient history. In 1968 Speidel became Associate Professor at the University of Hawaii at Manoa. He has since been promoted to Full Professor at the university, where he teaches the history of Ancient Greece, Ancient Rome, the ancient Near East, the Spanish Empire, the Portuguese Empire, and world cultures. Now Professor Emeritus, he is a member of the German Archaeological Institute.

Speidel specializes in the study of the Roman army, particularly its epigraphy, on which he has written a number of books. In recent years, Speidel has conducted extensive archaeological research on the warfare of ancient Eurasia and ancient Germanic mythology. He is considered one of the world's foremost experts on ancient warfare.

Selected works
 Die Equites singulares Augusti, 1965
 Guards of the Roman Armies, 1978
 Iuppiter Dolichenus, 1980
 Roman Army Studies, 1982-1992
 Die Denkmäler der Kaiserreiter: Equites singulares Augusti, 1994
 Riding for Caesar: The Roman Emperors’ Horse Guards, 1994
 Ancient Germanic Warriors: Warrior Styles from Trajan’s Column to Icelandic Sagas, 2004
 Emperor Hadrian’s speeches to the African Army: A New Text, 2007
 Dawn of Japan. Emperor, Gods, and Warriors on Jimmu’s Mirror, 2010

References

1937 births
American archaeologists
American military historians
German emigrants to the United States
Living people
People from Pforzheim
University of Freiburg alumni
University of Hawaiʻi at Mānoa faculty